Born Too Soon is a 1993 American television film about the life of Emily Butterfield, a baby girl who was born prematurely and died 53 days after her birth.  The film stars Michael Moriarty and Pamela Reed as Emily's parents, Fox Butterfield and Elizabeth Mehren.  It is based on Mehren's 1991 non-fiction book of the same name.

Plot

Cast
Michael Moriarty as Fox Butterfield
Pamela Reed as Elizabeth Mehren
Terry O'Quinn as Dr. Friedman
Joanna Gleason as Annemarie
Mariangela Pino as Leslie
Elizabeth Ruscio as Dr. Jane Gerstner
Tina Lifford as Latanya
Christianne Hirt as Carol
Christine Avila as Mrs. Diaz
Dennis Redfield as Tom
Jay Brazeau as Dr. Wolf

Production
The film was shot in Vancouver.

Reception
David Parkinson of Radio Times awarded the film three stars out of five.  Ken Tucker of Entertainment Weekly graded the film a B+.

The film received positive feedback from Butterfield and Mehren.

References

External links
 
 

1993 television films
1993 films
NBC network original films
Films set in 1988
American biographical films
Films set in the 20th century
Films shot in Vancouver
Films based on non-fiction books
1990s biographical films
1990s English-language films
1990s American films